The Ivory Coast Open or Open de Côte d'Ivoire was a golf tournament in the Ivory Coast. It was founded in 1980, and was an event on the Safari Circuit the following year. It was an event on the European-based Challenge Tour schedule in 1990 and 1991, and from 1996 to 1999. It has been held at President Golf Club, Yamoussoukro and Ivoire Golf Club, Abidjan.

The title has been won by some of the world's top golfers, including Vijay Singh, Ian Poulter, and Gary Player. The most successful player is England's Gordon J. Brand, who recorded three victories between 1981 and 1988. 

The tournament was revived in 2017 after an 18-year hiatus and was won by the Ghanaian golfer Vincent Torgah.

History
The first event in 1980 was to inaugurate the President Golf Club, Yamoussoukro. It was an invitation event with 27 professionals competing. Yamoussoukro was the birthplace of the President, Félix Houphouët-Boigny, who attended the event. Gary Player and Peter Townsend tied at 265, 23 under par and nine strokes ahead of the rest of the field. Townsend was bunkered on the first playoff hole and took a bogey 5 to Player's par 4.

In 1981 the event became the Ivory Coast Open and was added to the Safari Circuit schedule. It was won by Gordon J. Brand, who beat Martin Poxon at the first hole of a sudden-death playoff, after the two had tied on 271.

Winners
This list is incomplete. The 1999 event was advertised as the 18th edition.

Notes

References

External links
Coverage on the Challenge Tour's official site

Former Challenge Tour events
Safari Circuit events
Golf in Ivory Coast
Sport in Abidjan
Sport in Yamoussoukro
Recurring sporting events established in 1980